Sergey Vladimirovich Fomin (Сергей Владимирович Фомин) (born 16 February 1958 in Saint Petersburg, Russia) is a Russian American mathematician who has made important contributions in combinatorics and its relations with algebra, geometry, and representation theory. Together with Andrei Zelevinsky, he introduced cluster algebras.

Biography
Fomin received his M.Sc in 1979 and his Ph.D in 1982 from St. Petersburg State University under the direction of Anatoly Vershik and Leonid Osipov. Previous to his appointment at the University of Michigan, he held positions at the Massachusetts Institute of Technology from 1992 to 2000, at the St. Petersburg Institute for Informatics and Automation of the Russian Academy of Sciences, and at the Saint Petersburg Electrotechnical University. Sergey Fomin studied at the 45th Physics-Mathematics School and later taught mathematics there.

Research
Fomin's contributions include

 Discovery (with A. Zelevinsky) of cluster algebras.
 Work (jointly with A. Berenstein and A. Zelevinsky) on total positivity.
 Work (with A. Zelevinsky) on the Laurent phenomenon, including its applications to Somos sequences.

Awards and honors 
 Simons Fellow (2019) 
 Steele Prize for Seminal Contribution to Research (2018).
 Invited lecture at the International Congress of Mathematicians (Hyderabad, 2010).
 Robert M. Thrall Collegiate Professor of Mathematics at the University of Michigan.
 Fellow (2012) of the American Mathematical Society.

Selected publications

References

External links
 Home page of Sergey Fomin

20th-century American mathematicians
Mathematicians from Saint Petersburg
Fellows of the American Mathematical Society
University of Michigan faculty
1958 births
Living people
Algebraists
Combinatorialists
21st-century American mathematicians
International Mathematical Olympiad participants
Massachusetts Institute of Technology faculty